The 1983 NCAA Division I Men's Soccer Tournament was the 24th organized men's college soccer tournament by the National Collegiate Athletic Association, to determine the top college soccer team in the United States. The Indiana Hoosiers won their second consecutive national title by defeating the Columbia Lions in the championship game, 1–0, after one overtime period. The final match was played on December 10, 1983, in Fort Lauderdale, Florida, at Lockhart Stadium for the second straight year.

Early rounds

Final

See also  
 NCAA Division II Men's Soccer Championship
 NCAA Division III Men's Soccer Championship
 NAIA Men's Soccer Championship

References 

NCAA Division I Men's Soccer Tournament seasons
NCAA Division I Men's
NCAA Division I Men's Soccer Tournament
NCAA Division I Men's Soccer Tournament